Marc B. Shapiro (Hebrew: מלך שפירא, born 1966) is a professor and the author of various books and articles on Jewish history, philosophy, theology, and rabbinic literature.

Education and career 
Shapiro received his BA at Brandeis University and his PhD at Harvard University, where he was the last PhD student of Professor Isadore Twersky. He received rabbinical ordination from Rabbi Ephraim Greenblatt. Shapiro's father is Edward S. Shapiro, who has published books on American history and American Jewish history.

Shapiro holds the Harry and Jeanette Weinberg Chair in Judaic Studies at the University of Scranton. Shapiro is an on-line lecturer for Torah in Motion, for which he also leads Jewish history tours to Europe and Morocco. He often writes for the Seforim Blog.

Shapiro has been a resident of West Orange, New Jersey.

Writing 
Shapiro's writings often challenge the bounds of the conventional Orthodox understanding of Judaism, using academic methodology while adhering to Modern Orthodox sensibilities. His publications have had mixed reception, ranging from criticism within the American publication Jewish Action, to support throughout the spectrum of Modern Orthodoxy  .

Shapiro's book, Between the Yeshiva World and Modern Orthodoxy: The Life and Works of Rabbi Jehiel Jacob Weinberg, a biography of Yechiel Yaakov Weinberg, was a National Jewish Book Award finalist. His second book, The Limits of Orthodox Theology: Maimonides' Thirteen Principles Reappraised, also a National Jewish Book Award finalist, argued against the conventional Orthodox belief that Maimonides Thirteen Principles of Faith are unquestionable dogma. Gidon Rothstein, writing in the Association for Jewish Studies Review, called the book's collection of sources "remarkable."

Shapiro's 2006 book,  Saul Lieberman and the Orthodox, discusses how the Orthodox world related to Saul Lieberman, who was a recognized talmudic scholar who chose to teach at the Conservative Jewish Theological Seminary of America.

Shapiro's 2008 book, Studies in Maimonides and His Interpreters, looks at how Maimonides has been understood in both the traditional and the academic worlds. It also deals with Maimonides' attitude towards superstition.

In 2015, Shapiro's book Changing the Immutable: How Orthodox Judaism Rewrites Its History, was released, documenting the phenomenon of internal censorship in Orthodoxy; where Adam Ferziger said the book "is the outstanding product of a master of rabbinic literature and an extraordinarily sharp-eyed and meticulous scholar." Yair Hoffman, writing in the Hareidi online website Yeshiva World News, criticized the book, saying that "there is a plethora of material that simply should not have been included in the book because it does not back up his thesis." Ezra Glinter, writing in The Forward, praised Shapiro's "evenhanded, evidence-heavy approach" and that he was not a "polemicist," but said "his argument could also have benefited from a more critical thrust."

In 2019 Shapiro published Iggerot Malkhei Rabbanan which contains more than thirty years of correspondence with some of the world's most outstanding Torah scholars.

Books, Articles, Lectures 
Between the Yeshiva World and Modern Orthodoxy: The Life and Works of Rabbi Jehiel Jacob Weinberg, 1884–1966 (London, 1999)
Collected Writings of R. Jehiel Jacob Weinberg, 2 Volumes (Scranton, 1998, 2003)
The Limits of Orthodox Theology: Maimonides' Thirteen Principles Reappraised (Oxford, 2004)
Saul Lieberman and the Orthodox (Scranton, 2006)
Studies in Maimonides and His Interpreters (Scranton, 2008)
Changing the Immutable: How Orthodox Judaism Rewrites Its History (Oxford, 2015) 
Iggerot Malkhei Rabbanan (Scranton, 2019)
Shapiro posts at the Seforim Blog
Shapiro series on the Mir Yeshiva escape to Shanghai
Shapiro series on Saul Lieberman
Shapiro series on his latest book, Iggerot Malkhei Rabbanan
Shapiro series on the rise of Reform and the rabbinic response
Shapiro series on Zechariah Frankel and the Positive-Historical School
Shapiro series on Rav Soloveitchik's letters
Shapiro class on kitniyot
Shapiro class on Torah study on Christmas Eve
Shapiro class on Rabbi Yitzhak Nissim
Shapiro class on Rabbi Elijah Benamozegh
Shapiro class on Rabbi Shalom Messas
Shapiro class on Rabbi Joseph Kafih
Shapiro lecture on Rabbi Joseph Messas
Shapiro lecture on Rabbi Zvi Yehuda and the Hazon Ish
Shapiro lecture on Issues of Dogma in Recent Orthodox Literature
Shapiro discussion of R. Esriel Hildesheimer and women's education
Seforim Chatter interview
Credo 13
Shapiro Academia page

References

Jewish historians
Judaic studies
University of Scranton faculty
American Modern Orthodox Jews
1966 births
Living people
Harvard University alumni
Brandeis University alumni
People from West Orange, New Jersey